Saddlemates is a 1941 American Western "Three Mesquiteers" B-movie directed by Lester Orlebeck and starring Robert Livingston, Bob Steele, and Rufe Davis.

Cast 
 Robert Livingston as Stony Brooke
 Bob Steele as Tucson Smith
 Rufe Davis as Lullaby Joslin
 Gale Storm as Susan Langley
 Forbes Murray as Col. Langley
 Cornelius Keefe as Lt. Bob Manning
 George Lynn as LeRoque / Wanechee (as Peter George Lynn)
 Marin Sais as Mrs. Langley
 Martin Faust as Chief Thunder Bird (as Marty Faust)
 Glenn Strange as Little Bear
 Ellen Lowe as Aunt Amanda

References

External links 

1941 films
1941 Western (genre) films
American Western (genre) films
American black-and-white films
Republic Pictures films
Three Mesquiteers films
Films directed by Lester Orlebeck
1940s English-language films
1940s American films